Calocybe is a small genus of about 40 species of mushroom, including St. George's mushroom, which is edible, and milky mushroom, which is edible and is cultivated in India. There are not many species of this genus in Britain. The name is derived from the Ancient Greek terms kalos "pretty", and cubos "head". Around nine species are found in neotropical regions.

Species

References

Lyophyllaceae
Agaricales genera